Ekota Express is a named inter-city passenger train of Bangladesh. It runs between Kamalapur railway station of Dhaka District and Bir Muktijoddha Sirajul Islam railway station of Panchagarh District.

Rolling stock 
On 2 September 2016, Ekota Express along with Drutojan Express were converted from meter-gauge to broad-gauge. Ekota Express has a load of 13/26 and can hold up to 1,200 passengers.

On 16 December 2016, railway coaches of Ekota Express along with Drutojan Express were changed with newer ones imported from Indonesia.

On 11 November 2018, the route of Ekota and Drutojan Express were extended from Dhaka–Dinajpur to Dhaka–Panchagarh. As a result, the shuttle train service between Dinajpur and Panchagarh was closed.

References

External links

1986 establishments in Bangladesh
Named passenger trains of Bangladesh